The 2014 Ukrainian Football Amateur League season was played from 30 April to 17 October 2014.

Teams
 Debut: FC Mayak Sarny, FC Kolos Kovalivka, FC Balkany Zorya, FC Varvarivka Mykolaiv, FC AF Piatykhatska Volodymyrivka, FC Elektrovazhmash Kharkiv
 Newly admitted former professional clubs: FC Podillya Khmelnytskyi, FC Yednist Plysky, FC Myr Hornostayivka
 Returning clubs: FC VPK-Ahro Shevchenkivka, FC Lehion Zhytomyr

Withdrawn
List of clubs that took part in last year competition, but chose not to participate in 2014 season.
 FC Bukovyna-2-LS Chernivtsi
 FC Zbruch Volochysk
 FC Avanhard Novohrad-Volynskyi
 FC LKT Slavutych
 YSB Chernihiv
 ITV Simferopol
 FC Hvardiyets Hvardiyske
 FC Lokomotyv Kupyansk
 FC Nove Zhyttia Andriyivka
 FC Barsa Sumy
 FC Bastion Illichivsk
 FC Kolos Khlibodarivka

Locations

First stage

Group 1

Group 2

Group 3

Notes:
 FC USK-Rubin Donetsk was included in the group, yet because of the situation in the East Ukraine (War in Donbass) it was forced to withdraw. The club played only one game tying it with AF-Pyatykhatska 3:3. All its results were annulled.

Group 4

Second stage
The games in the group took place on September 17 through 20 in Holovkivka and Petrove (both in Kirovohrad Oblast).

Group 1

Group 2
The games in the group took place on September 17 through 20 in Vynnyky and Dubliany (both suburbs of Lviv).

Final

See also
 2014 Ukrainian Amateur Cup

References

Ukrainian Football Amateur League seasons
4
4
Uk
Uk